Macal may refer to:
 Macal River, a river in Belize
 The edible corms of the genus Xanthosoma